Sergey Alexandrovich Karaganov (born 10 September 1952 in Moscow) is a Russian political scientist who heads the Council on Foreign and Defense Policy, a security analytical institution founded by Vitaly Shlykov. He is also the dean of the Faculty of World Economy and International Affairs at Moscow's Higher School of Economics. Karaganov was a close associate of Yevgeny Primakov, and has been Presidential Advisor to both Boris Yeltsin and Vladimir Putin. He is considered close to Putin and Sergey Lavrov.

Karaganov has been a member of the Trilateral Commission since 1998, and served on the International Advisory Board of the Council on Foreign Relations. He has also been Deputy Director of the Institute of Europe at the USSR (now Russian) Academy of Sciences since 1983.

Political thought

Karaganov Doctrine
Karaganov is known as the progenitor of the Karaganov Doctrine, which states that Moscow should pose as the defender of human rights of ethnic Russians living in the 'near abroad' for the purpose of gaining political influence in these regions. This idea was first brought into domestic Russian Federation politics by Boris Yeltsin in 1992.

After Karaganov published an article advocating this stance in 1992, Russia's foreign policy position linked Russian troop withdrawals from the Baltics with the end of 'systemic discrimination' against Russians in these countries. It was already a subject of controversy in February 1994 when the doctrine was the subject of remarks by Lennart Meri, the then-president of Estonia, in a speech to Hamburgers on 25 February.

In 2022 Karaganov claimed full ownership of this idea in a serious interview.

The Karaganov Doctrine has been likened by scholars to the idea that furnished Hitler's 1938 Anschluss of Austria.

Eurasianism as ideology
In addition to his Doctrine, Karaganov has advocated for a united Sino-Russian strategy to unify a Eurasian bloc. He argues that the Eurasian Economic Union (EEU) and China's One Belt One Road Initiative (OBOR), will work together to promote economic integration throughout the region. Many experts disagree with this judgement, claiming that China, as a far more powerful economy, will simply dominate this Eurasian bloc. This would counter Russian ambitions to regain their foothold as a global power. In an April 2002 interview published in the journal Russia in Foreign Affairs, Karaganov defined Russia's main foreign policy goal as forcing its own dominance on the globe and breaking the security order put in place at the end of the Cold War in 1991.

Authoritarianism embedded into genetic code
Karaganov has been quoted to say: "Russia is genetically an authoritarian power. Russia’s authoritarianism was not imposed from above but is the result of our history which has formed our genetic code."

Role in Russia's war on Ukraine 

In an April 2019 interview with Time Magazine, Karaganov considered that not allowing Russia to join NATO was the “one of the worst mistakes in political history. It automatically put Russia and the West on a collision course, eventually sacrificing Ukraine”. In January 2022, he stated that NATO is a "political cancer" that aims to kill the "healthy" Russian state.

Karaganov, who is known as a close advisor to Russian President Vladimir Putin, formulated many of the core ideas that led to Russia's invasion of Ukraine on 24 February 2022. One week earlier Karaganov explained that "the situation is so dire" that "war is inevitable", as Russia could only achieve its goals by military means, since, unlike the United States, the dominant post-Cold War power, Russia had no political, cultural, ideological or economic benefits by which to bring other states under its influence. Karaganov lamented that Russia's neighbors generally saw the West as offering more attractive political and economic models, and Russia therefore had no choice but to gain their submission by force. 

Regarding Ukraine, Karaganov claimed that it was necessary to subdue it in order to prevent the further expansion of NATO. As justification for an unprovoked invasion, Karaganov suggested that Ukraine was not a viable state anyway, and "most likely, the country will slowly disintegrate," or, alternatively, it will be broken up into smaller parts, and "something may go to Russia, something to Hungary, something to Poland, and something may remain a formally independent Ukrainian state." However, he has said that "occupying" Ukraine is "the worst-case scenario".

Instead of the legally-mandated "police action" or "special military operation",  Karaganov uses the word "war" openly: "The stakes of the Russian elite are very high – for them it is an existential war." He has also said that "we need a kind of a solution which would be called peace, and which would include de facto the creation of some kind of a viable, pro-Russian government on the territory of Ukraine, and real security for the Donbas republics."

In April 2022, in an interview with the Italian newspaper Corriere della Sera, Karaganov stated that "war was inevitable, they were a spearhead of NATO. We made the very hard decision to strike first, before the threat becomes deadlier." He further said the war in Ukraine "will be used to restructure Russian elite and Russian society. It will become a more militant-based and national-based society, pushing out non-patriotic elements from the elite." He also said that "Demilitarization means destruction of Ukrainian military forces - that is happening and will accelerate. Of course, if Ukraine is supported with new weapons, that could prolong the agony. ... The war will be victorious, in one way or another. I assume demilitarization will be achieved and there will be denazification, too. Like we did in Germany and in Chechnya. Ukrainians will become much more peaceful and friendly to us."

In May 2022 Karaganov stated India figured extremely high on the agenda of the Russian foreign policy and strong India-Russia ties will help stabilise to New Delhi’s ties with Beijing besides bringing a balance in Moscow’s partnership with China.

Additional notes 

References

Select bibliography

Interviews

Criticism
 
 
 
 
 
 
 
 
 
 Vinokurov E (2017) Eurasian Economic Union: Current state and preliminary results. Russian Journal of Economics 3(1): 54-70. https://doi.org/10.1016/j.ruje.2017.02.004

External links 
 Official website

1952 births
Living people
Russian Jews
Russian political scientists
Russian political writers
Geopoliticians
Moscow State University alumni
Academic staff of the Higher School of Economics
Politics of Russia
Russian diaspora
Russian nationalism
Russian irredentism
Russian philosophers